Fedora (or Flexible Extensible Digital Object Repository Architecture) is a digital asset management (DAM) content repository architecture upon which institutional repositories, digital archives, and digital library systems might be built. Fedora is the underlying architecture for a digital repository, and is not a complete management, indexing, discovery, and delivery application. It is a modular architecture built on the principle that interoperability and extensibility are best achieved by the integration of data, interfaces, and mechanisms (i.e., executable programs) as clearly defined modules.

History
The Fedora Repository open source software is a project supported by the DuraSpace not-for-profit organization. The software has its origins in the Flexible Extensible Digital Object Repository Architecture (i.e., Fedora) which was originally designed and developed by researchers at Cornell University.  Fedora is an architecture for storing, managing, and accessing digital content in the form of digital objects inspired by the Kahn and Wilensky Framework. Fedora began as a DARPA and National Science Foundation funded research project at Cornell University's Digital Library Research Group in 1997, where the first reference implementation was written in Java using a CORBA-based distributed object approach. The University of Virginia began experimenting with the Cornell software and later joined with Cornell to establish the Fedora Repository project that re-implemented Fedora as open source software.  Since then, several modifications have been made to the architecture, and in late 2005, version 2.1 was released.  Fedora defines a set of abstractions for expressing digital objects, asserting relationships among digital objects, and linking "behaviors" (i.e., services) to digital objects.

In 2003 Red Hat, Inc. applied for trademark status for the name "Fedora" to be associated with their Linux operating system project. Cornell and UVA formally disputed the request and, as a final settlement, all parties settled on a co-existence agreement that stated that the Cornell-UVA project could use the name when clearly associated with open source software for digital object repository systems and that Red Hat could use the name when it was clearly associated with open source computer operating systems.

Technology
Fedora provides a general-purpose management layer for digital objects. Object management is based on content models that represent data objects (units of content) or collections of data objects. The objects contain linkages between datastreams (internally managed or external content files), metadata (inline or external), system metadata (including a PID – persistent identifier – which is unique to the repository), and behaviors that are themselves code objects that provide bindings or links to disseminators (software processes that can be used with the datastreams). Content models can be thought of as containers that give a useful shape to information poured into them; if the information fits the container, it can immediately be used in predefined ways.

Fedora supports two types of access services: a management client for ingest, maintenance, and export of objects; or via API hooks for customized web-based access services built on either HTTP or SOAP. A Fedora Repository provides a general-purpose management layer for digital objects, and containers that aggregate mime-typed datastreams (e.g., digital images, XML files, metadata). Out-of-the-box Fedora includes the necessary software tools to ingest, manage, and provide basic delivery of objects with few or no custom disseminators, or can be used as a backend to a more monolithic user interface.

Fedora supports ingest and export of digital objects in a variety of XML formats. This enables interchange of objects between Fedora and other applications, as well as facilitating digital preservation and archiving.

 Digital Object Model The FEDORA digital object model allows aggregation of both metadata and digital content as "datastreams", regardless of format and physical location. FEDORA objects can include content from external or distributed repositories.  Digital Objects can be modeled to represent many types of entities from digital texts, publications, photos, videos, and datasets.  Digital objects can have associated "behaviors" that can provide different views of the object, or that can produce dynamic transformations of digital object content. 
 Relationships  The FEDORA digital object model supports the ability to assert semantic relationships using the Resource Description Framework (RDF).  Relationships between objects and within objects can be indexed using a semantic triplestore that enables queries over the entire repository of digital objects.  
 Repository Service is based upon four main Application Programming Interfaces (APIs): manage, access, search and metadata harvesting via OAI-PMH.  The system is scalable and flexible and Fedora users have adopted the repository as a core component of many applications and platforms.

The Fedora Project is currently supported by the DuraSpace organization.

See also

 Content management system
 Digital preservation
 Islandora

References

Further reading
 Acs, B., et al., A general approach to data-intensive computing using the Meandre component-based framework. Wands '10 Proceedings of the 1st International Workshop on Workflow Approaches to New Data-centric Science. June 2010.
 Allinson, J., Feng, Y., Building flexible workflows with Fedora, the University of York approach. Open Repositories 2010 Conference, Duraspace User Group. July 2010.
 Baldiris, S., Avila, C., Rivera, P., Guevara, J., Fabregat, R., Web editing module for tagging metadata of the Fedora Commons repository learning objects under DRD and LOM standards. FIE '11 Proceedings of the 2011 Frontiers in Education Conference. October 2011.
 Bayliss, S., Dow, M., Allinson, J., Using Semantic Web technologies to integrate thesauri with Fedora to support cataloguing, discovery, re-use and interoperability. Open Repositories 2011 Conference. June 2011.
 Bayliss, S., Dow, M., Fedora repositories and Persistent Identifiers - an architectural approach that puts persistent identifiers at the heart of the content model. Open Repositories 2011 Conference. June 2011.
 Bertazzo, M., Di Iorio, A., Preserving and delivering audiovisual content integrating Fedora Commons and MediaMosa. Open Repositories 2011 Conference. June 2011.
 Blekinge, A., Christiansen, K., Enhanced Content Models. Open Repositories 2010 Conference, Duraspace User Group. July 2010.
 Curley, A., The Hydraulics Project: Empowering Communities to Build a Digital Library Utilizing Fedora and an Event-Driven Service-Oriented Messaging Framework. Open Repositories 2011 Conference. June 2011.
 DiLauro, T., Choosing the components of a digital infrastructure. First Monday Journal. May 3, 2004.
 Ferreira, M., Baptista, A., Ramalho, J., A Foundation for Automatic Digital Preservation. Ariadne Magazine. July 30, 2006.
 Gourley, D., Battino Viterbo, P., A sustainable repository infrastructure for digital humanities: the DHO experience. EuroMed'10: Proceedings of the Third international conference on Digital heritage. November 2010.
 Green, R., Awre, C., Waddington, S., The CLIF Project: The Repository as Part of a Content Lifecycle. Ariadne Magazine. March 9, 2012.
 Green, R., The RepoMMan Project: Automating metadata and workflow for Fedora. D-Lib Magazine. September 2005.
 Hamer, G., Custom Rich Client, Multimedia Interfaces for the Web and Mobile for Fedora and Duracloud Using Adobe Open Source Solutions. Open Repositories 2010 Conference, Duraspace User Group. July 2010.
 Kennan, M., Kingsley, D., The state of the nation: A snapshot of Australian institutional repositories. First Monday Journal. February 2, 2009.
 Ludwig, J., Enke, H., Fischer, T., Aschenbrenner, A., Diversity and Interoperability of Repositories in a Grid Curation Environment. Open Repositories 2010 Conference, General Sessions. July 2010.
 Puschmann, C., Reimer, P., DiPP and eLanguage: Two cooperative models for open access. First Monday Journal. October 1, 2007.
 Salo, D., Retooling Libraries for the Data Challenge. Ariadne Magazine. July 30, 2010.
 Soroka, A., The Use Of Message-Driven Workflows On The Service Bus Pattern for Indexing Fedora Repositories. Open Repositories 2011 Conference. June 2011.
 Varanka, M., Varjonen, V., Ryhänen, T., Developing publishing process support system with Fedora and Orbeon Forms - A case study. Open Repositories 2010 Conference, Duraspace User Group. July 2010.
 Webb, F., Paulson, J., Harvest: A Digital Object Search and Discovery System for Distributed Collections with Different File Types and Structures. Open Repositories 2010 Conference, Duraspace User Group.  July 2010.

External links
 

Digital library software
Free and open-source software
Free software